John Winters may refer to:

 John Winters (footballer) (born 1960), English footballer
 John D. Winters (1916–1997), American historian
 John W. Winters (1920–2004), American real estate developer, politician, and civil rights activist

See also
 John Winter (disambiguation)